Donald Albert Marshall (born August 2, 1932) is a Canadian former politician who served in the Legislative Assembly of British Columbia from 1970 to 1972 from the electoral district of South Peace River, a member of the Social Credit Party. He switched his affiliation to Progressive Conservative on March 22, 1972.

References

Living people
1932 births
British Columbia Social Credit Party MLAs
Politicians from Calgary